Fritillaria verticillata is a flowering plant in the lily family Liliaceae, native to Japan, Korea, Mongolia, Xinjiang, Kazakhstan and the Altay region of Siberia.

The leaves are mostly in whorls, with 4-7 leaves per node, each up to 10 cm long but rarely more than 10 mm across. The flowers are pendent, nodding, bell-shaped, white or pale yellow, sometimes with purple spots.

It formerly included the variety Fritillaria verticillata var. thunbergii  - now called Fritillaria thunbergii.

References

External links
Pacific Bulb Society, Asian Fritillaria Four photos of several species including Fritillaria verticillata
Practical Plants, Fritillaria verticillata culinary and medicinal uses
Natural Medicinal Herbs, Fritillaria verticillata

verticillata
Plants described in 1799
Flora of Asia